Adhu Oru Kana Kaalam is a 2005 Indian Tamil-language romantic drama film written and directed by Balu Mahendra. The film featured Dhanush and Priyamani , while Karunas and Delhi Ganesh played supporting roles. The music for the film was scored by Ilaiyaraaja, while Sai Suresh produced the venture. The film is a remake of the director's own Telugu film Nireekshana. It was remade in to Malayalam as Yathra. The film was released on 2 November 2005, coinciding with Diwali, and received a below average response commercially.

Plot 
Srinivasan (Dhanush) escapes from jail and hitches a ride on a truck to meet his love Thulasi (Priyamani). He reveals his flashback to the lorry driver, telling him of the disputes between his ambitious father and himself. When the parents leave home for a week, Srinivasan is left in the maid's care. Soon, he meets the maid's daughter, Thulasi, his childhood playmate, and they fall in love. As expected, his father objects to his son falling in love with Thulasi. One day, Srinivasan and his friends land up in prison for crashing their car on a police vehicle. While at the police station, Srinivasan locks horns with an inmate in jail and when he pushes him in a fit of rage, he sustains a serious head injury subsequently killing him. Eventually Srinivasan gets convicted for 10-year-rigorous imprisonment. His mother dies, and Thulasi's family goes bankrupt and leaves to their native village in Ooty. A dejected Srinivasan escapes from prison to meet Thulasi. Whether the two join forms the rest of the story.

Cast 
 Dhanush as Srinivasan
 Priyamani  as Thulasi (Voice dubbed by Prameela)
 Delhi Ganesh as Ganesh
 Kalairani as Sathya
 Karunas
 Thalaivasal Vijay
 Amarasigamani as Inspector
 Usha
 Munnar Ramesh
 Tejashree in a special appearance

Production 
Following the success of Kadhal Kondein (2003), Balu Mahendra signed on Dhanush to appear in his next film in July 2003. Initially the director revealed that the film titled Adhu Oru Kana Kaalam would be an extension to his 1979 film Azhiyadha Kolangal stating that Dhanush would play a teenager infatuated by a woman who is fifteen years older than him to be played by Ramya Krishnan. However he opted against doing that story and decided to build his film around two of his Malayalam films from the 1980s – Nireekshana and Yathra, and the title of the film was subsequently changed to Unakkae Uyiranaen. It was later changed back to the original title before release.

The shoot for the film began in December 2003 with scenes featuring the lead pair shot in Chennai. The film was shot in Hogenakkal Falls in November 2004, with Dhanush marrying Aishwarya Rajinikanth in between schedules. He consequently also delayed his honeymoon, to commit to a fifteen-day schedule for the film in December 2004. During the making of the film, Dhanush also struck up a friendship with assistant director Vetrimaaran, and the pair have since come together for four films. The film was delayed through late 2004 after the director fell ill.

In August 2005, the film faced criticism for a promotional hoarding put up in Chennai which featured photographs of Priyamani and Dhanush in a compromising position. It became the second such film during the period, where they were forced to remove the hoardings due to public protest after Silambarasan's Vallavan. Further trouble occurred in October 2005, Balu Mahendra approached the police seeking action to secure a sum of Rs 3.75 lakh, an outstanding amount of his salary for directing the movie, from the producer Sai Suresh and matters were resolved quickly. Although early reports suggested that Dhanush would be the distributor, producer Vishwas Sundar, bought the distribution rights and subsequently released the film in the Diwali season of 2005.

After the film's release, members of the regional censor board complained that the promos of Adhu Oru Kana Kaalam were being shown on television without mentioning that the film had an "adult" certificate. At the time of censoring, Balu Mahendra was not willing to cut the deep lip-to-lip kissing scenes between the lead pair of Dhanush and Priya Mani and opted for an "A" certificate, which he subsequently refused to note down in the promotions.

Release 
The film received mixed reviews, with Shobha Warrier of Rediff.com stating that the film "disappointed", criticizing the film in comparison to Mahendra's earlier work, Yathra. The Hindu's critic noted that "excelling in technical aspects, the film falls short in the area of storyline." In comparison, Indiaglitz.com noted that "Balu Mahendra's direction is from the heart. Yet, there is a cerebral touch. He takes up subjects that are every-day, but infuses in them a special meaning. He gives his own interpretation" The critic also proceeded to praise the performances of the lead pair.

Adhu Oru Kana Kaalam opened alongside other big films like Vijay-starrer Sivakasi and the Vikram-starrer Majaa. The film was described by trade pundits as a "complete wash-out".

Soundtrack 

The soundtrack of the film was composed by Ilaiyaraaja.

References

External links 
 

2000s Tamil-language films
2005 films
Films directed by Balu Mahendra
Films shot in Ooty
Indian romantic drama films
Films scored by Ilaiyaraaja
Tamil remakes of Telugu films
2005 romantic drama films